Edmund Henry Ellis (17 February 1841 — 3 March 1910) was an English first-class cricketer and solicitor.

The son of George Henry Ellis, he was born at Battersea in February 1841 and was educated at Rugby School. Ellis played first-class cricket on three occasions for the Marylebone Cricket Club from 1861 to 1863, playing a match each against Hampshire, Middlesex and Oxford University. He scored 31 runs in his three matches, with a highest score of 28 not out. He was by profession a solicitor, having been admitted in 1864. He was married to Dorothea Hilda Danvers, daughter of Sir Juland Danvers. He later added her surname to his to be known as Edmund Henry Ellis-Danvers. Ellis died at Chelsea in March 1910.

References

External links

1841 births
1910 deaths
People from Battersea
People educated at Harrow School
English cricketers
Marylebone Cricket Club cricketers
English solicitors